Ignatius George II was the Patriarch of Antioch and head of the Syriac Orthodox Church from 1687 until his death in 1708.

Biography
George was born at Mosul in 1648, and was the son of ‘Abd al-Karim. He had a brother named Rizq Allah and a sister called Maryam, who had several sons, Isaac, Matthew, and Jacob. George became a monk at the nearby monastery of Saint Matthew, where he and his nephew Isaac were ordained as priests in 1669 by Basil Yeldo, Maphrian of the East. In 1673, George and Isaac aided Basil Yeldo in renovating the monastery of Saint Matthew, for which the three of them were imprisoned by the governor of Mosul for a short while. In 1677, he was ordained as archbishop of Gazarta by Basil Yeldo, upon which he assumed the name Dioscorus.

After the abdication of Basil Yeldo, George was ordained as his successor as Maphrian of the East by Patriarch Ignatius Abdulmasih I in 1683 or 1684, upon which he assumed the name Basil. He was elected to succeed Ignatius Abdulmasih I as patriarch of Antioch, and was consecrated at the Church of the Forty Martyrs at Mardin on 22 or 23 April 1687. George assumed the name Ignatius, and received a firman from the Ottoman government thereby recognising his ascension to the patriarchal office. In the same year, he ordained his nephew Isaac as Maphrian of the East, and entrusted him with the authority to administrate the whole church.

In George's tenure as patriarch, he undertook an effort to revitalise the church and to defend it against the inroads of the Syriac Catholic Church, which had seceded from the Syriac Orthodox Church. After having spent a year in the courts at Aleppo in Syria, George recovered control over churches that had been seized by Syriac Catholics. In Aleppo itself, he retook the Church of the Virgin Mary more than once, and consecrated the Holy Chrism in the city in 1691. In the 1690s, George renovated churches at Edessa and Amida, and later also at Gazarta, Mosul, and the three churches at Mardin. In doing so, George began reconstruction of the monastery's eastern wall, parts of the northern wall, the monastic cells, and parts of the church of the Virgin Mary from 1696 to 1699; he also had the patriarchal chapel constructed atop the church of the Virgin Mary.

In , George constructed a church at Ḥisn Manṣūr, and later also at Zakho. In 1708, in response to the outbreak of plague at Mardin and Amida, George led a procession of Christians of mixed confessions from Mardin to the nearby monastery of Saint Jacob to pray for deliverance, and delivered a sermon, in which the patriarch preached that the plague was sent by God to punish those who had converted to Catholicism. George served as patriarch until his death on 5 June 1708, and he was buried at the monastery of Saint Ananias. In a biography of George written in 1730 in Arabic by Timothy ’Isa, archbishop of the monastery of Saint Ananias, he is credited with several miracles. As patriarch, he consecrated twenty bishops.

Episcopal succession
As patriarch, George ordained the following bishops:

Basil Isaac, Maphrian of the East (1687)
Dioscorus Saliba, bishop of Jazirat Ibn ʿUmar (1691)
Gregorius Jacob, archbishop of Gargar (1692)
Gregorius Simon, archbishop of Jerusalem (1693)
Severus Abraham, archbishop of Edessa (1694)
Cyril Bishara, bishop of the monastery of Saint Julian and Hama (1695/1696)
Cyril Yeshu, archbishop of Bitlis (1697)
Isaac Saliba, archbishop of the monastery of Mar Abai (1697)
Dionysius Joseph, archbishop of Ma’dan (1701)
Iyawannis Matthew, archbishop of the monastery of Saint Matthew (1701)
Dionysius John, archbishop of the monastery of Saint Ananias (1702)
John, bishop of the monastery of Qatra (1704)
Basil Abd al-Ahad, bishop of Zarjal (1705)
Gregorius ‘Abd al-Azali, bishop of Damascus (1706)
Basil Abraham, bishop of Bushairiyya (1706)
Athanasius Aslan, archbishop of the Patriarchal Office (1707)
Julius Zmaria, bishop of the monastery of Saint Julian (1707)
Basil George, archbishop of Bushairiyya (1707)
Severus Elijah, archbishop of Edessa (1707)
Dioscorus, bishop of the Monastery of Saint Moses the Abyssinian (c. 1708)

References

Bibliography

George II
1648 births
1708 deaths
17th-century Oriental Orthodox archbishops
18th-century Oriental Orthodox archbishops
Assyrians from the Ottoman Empire
Maphrians
People from Mosul
Prisoners and detainees of the Ottoman Empire
Miracle workers
Oriental Orthodox bishops in the Ottoman Empire
17th-century people from the Ottoman Empire
18th-century people from the Ottoman Empire